Samuel Allen McCoskry (November 9, 1804 - August 1, 1886), was the first Bishop of Michigan in the Episcopal Church in the United States of America, but was deposed by the House of Bishops.

Biography
Samuel McCoskry was born in Carlisle, Pennsylvania, on November 9, 1804, the son of Dr Samuel Allen McCoskry, a Physician, and Scottish-born Alison Nisbet. He attended the United States Military Academy for two years, then graduated from Dickinson College in 1825; was ordained deacon and priest in 1833 in Christ Church, Reading, Pennsylvania. After serving as rector of St. Paul's Church, Philadelphia, for two years, he was elected first bishop of the Episcopal Diocese of Michigan and was consecrated at St. Paul's on July 7, 1836. McCrosky resigned in 1878, citing ill health, but allegations of moral misconduct came to light, and he fled to Europe. The House of Bishops was unable to investigate McCoskry because of his absence, so it voted to depose him on the grounds of abandoning his diocese. McCoskry was deposed on December 3, 1878, and died August 1, 1886.

Consecrators
 The Most Reverend Henry Ustick Onderdonk, 2nd bishop of Pennsylvania
 The Right Reverend George Washington Doane, 2nd bishop of New Jersey
 The Right Reverend Jackson Kemper, missionary bishop to Northwest
Samuel Allen McCoskry was the 32nd bishop consecrated for the Episcopal Church.

See also
 List of Bishop Succession in the Episcopal Church

References

 The Episcopal Church Annual. Morehouse Publishing: New York, NY (2005).

External links
 Web site of the Episcopal Church
 Web site of the Diocese of Michigan

1804 births
1886 deaths
People from Carlisle, Pennsylvania
Clergy from Detroit
Dickinson College alumni
19th-century American Episcopalians
Episcopal bishops of Michigan
19th-century American clergy